Samir Hadji (born 12 September 1989, in Creutzwald) is a footballer who plays for the Luxembourgian club F91 Dudelange as a striker. Born in France, he has represented Morocco at youth level.

Personal life
He is the son of former Moroccan international Mustapha Hadji. Hadji's uncle is former AS Nancy striker Youssouf Hadji. He is described by his uncle as a "quick and athletic finisher".

Career
Hadji began his career playing for hometown club SR Creutzwald. In 2007, he ventured to Germany signing with 1. FC Saarbrücken in the Oberliga, the fifth division of German football. After two years, Hadji returned to France joining his father's former club AS Nancy. He spent two years playing on the club's Championnat de France amateur team making 59 appearances and scoring 18 goals before signing with RC Strasbourg in July 2010. Hadji made his professional debut on 30 July 2010 in the team's Coupe de la Ligue match against Évian. Hadji started the match and played the full 120 minutes as Strasbourg were defeated 5–4 on penalties.

After playing for CS Fola Esch in the Luxembourg National Division, Hadji moved to Excelsior Virton in 2019.

International career
Hadji made one appearance for the Morocco U23s in a 0–0 tie with the Niger U23s on 1 November 2011.

Honours
Fola Esch
BGL Ligue : 2012–13, 2014–15

Statistics

References

External links
 
 Mountakhab Profile 
 Soccerway Profile

Living people
1989 births
People from Creutzwald
Moroccan footballers
Morocco youth international footballers
French footballers
French sportspeople of Moroccan descent
French people of Shilha descent
RC Strasbourg Alsace players
CS Fola Esch players
Expatriate footballers in Germany
Expatriate footballers in Luxembourg
Ligue 2 players
Association football forwards
Sportspeople from Moselle (department)
Footballers from Grand Est 
French expatriate footballers
Expatriate footballers in Belgium
Moroccan expatriate footballers
Moroccan expatriate sportspeople in Germany
French expatriate sportspeople in Germany
Moroccan expatriate sportspeople in Belgium
French expatriate sportspeople in Belgium
Moroccan expatriate sportspeople in Luxembourg
French expatriate sportspeople in Luxembourg